Nicholas Joseph Browne (born November 19, 1980) is a former American football placekicker who played college football for the TCU Horned Frogs football team of Texas Christian University and was recognized as a consensus All-American.

Early years
Browne is from Garland, Texas and attended Naaman Forest High School.

College career
In 2002, Browne was on the Horned Frogs team that won the Conference USA Championship.

In 2003, Nick was named a consensus first-team All-American at placekicker. He earned this distinction by being named to the first-team of the Walter Camp Foundation and Football Writers Association of America. While normally to be a Consensus All-American a player must be named first team to three different recognized bodies, in 2003 no player was named to three so Browne and Nate Kaeding were both selected since both were named first team to two different recognized bodies.

References

External links
 Nick Browne – TCU Horned Frogs player profile from GoFrogs.com

1980 births
Living people
All-American college football players
American football placekickers
TCU Horned Frogs football players